Glen Oaks is a populated place situated in Yavapai County, Arizona, United States.

References

External links
 Glen Oaks – ghosttowns.com

 

Populated places in Yavapai County, Arizona
Ghost towns in Arizona